Al-Bukiryah Football Club is a Saudi Arabian football club based in Al Bukayriyah, Qassim. Founded in 1962, the club competes in the Saudi Second Division , the third tier of Saudi football.

History
The club was founded in 1962. The club was formerly known as Al-Amal Football Club, however, on the 28th of August, 2018, the club name was changed to Al-Bukiryah FC that we currently know.

Stadium
Al-Bukiryah Club Stadium

Current squad 
As of Saudi Second Division:

References

Bukayriyah
Football clubs in Al Bukayriyah